is a railway station in Eishō-chō, Isahaya, Nagasaki, Japan. It is owned by Kyushu Railway Company (JR Kyushu), and is the junction between three lines: the Nagasaki Main Line, Ōmura Line and the private Shimabara Railway Line.

Lines
This station is also served by the Nishi Kyushu Shinkansen.

Station layout
The station consists of three side platform and two island platforms serving seven tracks. Track/platform 0 is a dead-end siding which juts into the platform 1 (the side platform) and is used exclusively by the trains of the Shimabara Railway Line. Platform 2 is a second side platform serving track 2 while tracks 3 and 4 are served by the island platform. Platform 11 and 12 are for the Nishi Kyushu Shinkansen and they have two side platforms. Since 18 June 2016, Isahaya has operated out of a temporary station building while the construction of a new station building is in progress. The temporary building houses a JR Kyushu ticket counter with a (Midori no Madoguchi) facility as well as a Shimabara Railway ticket window. From the station building there is direct access to platform 0 while access to the other platforms is by means of an underpass which is served by steps and elevators.

Platforms
This station has a side platform for the Shimabara Railway line. The JR Kyushu has 2 island platform serving four tracks. The Nishi Kyushu Shinkansen has 2 side platforms serving two tracks, totaling to 7 tracks at this station.

History
On 27 November 1898 a link up was achieved with the track from Tosu which had expanded south to Ōmura and Nagayo, allowing through traffic from Tosu to Nagasaki. Isahaya was opened on the same day as an intermediate station on the track between Ōmura and Nagayo.

When the Kyushu Railway was nationalized on 1 July 1907, Japanese Government Railways (JGR) took over control of the station. On 12 October 1909, track from Tosu through Haiki, Ōmura, Isahaya, Nagayo to Nagasaki was designated the Nagasaki Main Line.

On 21 August 1911, the Shimabara Railway Line from Isahaya to Hon-Isahaya was opened.

The Ariake Nishi and Ariake Higashi Lines were then designated as part of the Nagasaki Main Line. The line from Haiki to Isahaya was separated to become the Ōmura Line.

With the privatization of Japanese National Railways (JNR), the successor of JGR, on 1 April 1987, control of the station passed to JR Kyushu.

In June 2016, work began on the construction of a new station building at Isahaya. The old station building, a timber structure in western style built in 1935, was noted for its role as a receiving station for relief trains carrying the injured from the atomic bomb at Nagasaki. This would be replaced by a new building scheduled to be completed in 2020, in time for the commencement of Shinkansen services to the station.

The Nishi Kyushu Shinkansen opened for service on 23 September 2022.

Passenger statistics
In fiscal 2016, the JR station was used by an average of 5,228 passengers daily (boarding passengers only), and it ranked 35th among the busiest stations of JR Kyushu.

For the Shimabara Railway station, in fiscal 2014, there were a total of 356,467 boarding passengers, given a daily average of 977 passengers.

Surrounding area
 Bus terminal for Nagasaki Kenei Bus and Shimabara Railway Bus

References

External links

Railway stations in Japan opened in 1898
Railway stations in Nagasaki Prefecture
Nagasaki Main Line
Ōmura Line
Stations of Shimabara Railway